Law and Justice (PiS) is a right-wing populist and national-conservative political party in Poland. Its chairman is Jarosław Kaczyński. 

It was founded in 2001 by Jarosław and Lech Kaczyński as a direct successor of the Centre Agreement after it split from the Solidarity Electoral Action (AWS). It managed to win the 2005 parliamentary and presidential elections, after which Lech became the president of Poland. It headed a parliamentary coalition with the League of Polish Families and Self-Defence of the Republic of Poland between 2005 and the 2007 election. It placed second and they remained in the parliamentary opposition until 2015. It regained the presidency in the 2015 election, and later won a majority of seats in the parliamentary election. They retained the positions following the 2019 and 2020 election.

During its foundation, it sought to position itself as a centrist Christian democratic party, although shortly after, it adopted more culturally and socially conservative views and began their shift to the right. Under Kaczyński's national-conservative and law and order agenda, PiS embraced the principles of economic interventionism. It has also pursued close relations with the Catholic Church, although in 2011, the Catholic-nationalist faction split off to form United Poland. During the 2010s, it also adopted right-wing populist positions. After regaining power, PiS gained popularity with transfer payments to families with children, but attracted international criticism and domestic protest movements by dismantling liberal-democratic checks and balances. Political scientists have characterized the party's governance as illiberal or authoritarian.

It is a member of the European Conservatives and Reformists, and on national-level, it heads the United Right coalition. It currently holds 198 seats in the Sejm and 44 in the Senate.

History

Formation
The party was created on a wave of popularity gained by Lech Kaczyński while heading the Polish Ministry of Justice (June 2000 to July 2001) in the AWS-led government, although local committees began appearing from 22 March 2001. The AWS itself was created from a diverse array of many small political parties. In the 2001 general election, PiS gained 44 (of 460) seats in the lower chamber of the Polish Parliament (Sejm) with 9.5% of votes. In 2002, Lech Kaczyński was elected mayor of Warsaw.  He handed the party leadership to his twin brother Jarosław in 2003.

In coalition government: 2005–2007

In the 2005 general election, PiS took first place with 27.0% of votes, which gave it 155 out of 460 seats in the Sejm and 49 out of 100 seats in the Senate. It was almost universally expected that the two largest parties, PiS and Civic Platform (PO), would form a coalition government. The putative coalition parties had a falling out, however, related to a fierce contest for the Polish presidency. In the end, Lech Kaczyński won the second round of the presidential election on 23 October 2005 with 54.0% of the vote, ahead of Donald Tusk, the PO candidate.

After the 2005 elections, Jarosław should have become Prime Minister. However, in order to improve his brother's chances of winning the presidential election (the first round of which was scheduled two weeks after the parliamentary election), PiS formed a minority government headed by Kazimierz Marcinkiewicz as prime minister, an arrangement that eventually turned out to be unworkable. In July 2006, PiS formed a right-wing coalition government with the agrarian populist Self-Defence of the Republic of Poland and the nationalist League of Polish Families, headed by Jarosław Kaczyński. Association with these parties, on the margins of Polish politics, severely affected the reputation of PiS. When accusations of corruption and sexual harassment against Andrzej Lepper, the leader of Self-Defence, surfaced, PiS chose to end the coalition and called for new elections.

In opposition: 2007–2015

In the 2007 general election, PiS managed to secure 32.1% of votes. Although an improvement over its showing from 2005, the results were nevertheless a defeat for the party, as Civic Platform (PO) gathered 41.5%. The party won 166 out of 460 seats in the Sejm and 39 seats in Poland's Senate.

On 10 April 2010, its former leader Lech Kaczyński died in the 2010 Polish Air Force Tu-154 crash. Jarosław Kaczyński becomes the sole leader of the party. He was the presidential candidate in the 2010 elections.

In majority government: 2015–present

The party won the 2015 parliamentary election, this time with an outright majority—something no Polish party had done since the fall of communism. In the normal course of events, this should have made Jarosław Kaczyński prime minister for a second time. However, Beata Szydło, perceived as being somewhat more moderate than Kaczyński, had been tapped as PiS's candidate for prime minister.

The party opposes liberal democracy seeing itself as inspired by Jozef Pilsudski's authoritarian Sanacja government. It supported controversial reforms carried out by the Hungarian Fidesz party, with Jarosław Kaczyński declaring in 2011 that "a day will come when we have a Budapest in Warsaw". PiS's 2015 victory prompted creation of a cross-party opposition movement, the Committee for the Defence of Democracy (KOD). Law and Justice has Proposed 2017 judicial reforms, which according to the party were meant to improve efficiency of the justice system, sparked protest as they were seen as undermining judicial independence. While these reforms were initially unexpectedly vetoed by President Duda, he later signed them into law. European Council president Donald Tusk warned that the bill might push Poland out of the EU. In 2017, the European Union began an Article 7 infringement procedure against Poland due to a "clear risk of a serious breach" in the rule of law and fundamental values of the European Union.

The party has caused what constitutional law scholar Wojciech Sadurski termed a "constitutional breakdown" by packing the Constitutional Court with its supporters, undermining parliamentary procedure, and reducing the president's and prime minister's offices in favour of power being wielded extra-constitutionally by party leader Jarosław Kaczyński. After eliminating constitutional checks, the government then moved to curtail the activities of NGOs and independent media, restrict freedom of speech and assembly, and reduce the qualifications required for civil service jobs in order to fill these positions with party loyalists. The media law was changed to give the governing party control of the state media, which was turned into a partisan outlet, with dissenting journalists fired from their jobs. Due to these political changes, Poland has been termed an "illiberal democracy", "plebiscitarian authoritarianism", or "velvet dictatorship with a façade of democracy".

The party won reelection in the 2019 parliamentary election. With 44% of the popular vote, Law and Justice received the highest vote share by any party since Poland returned to democracy in 1989, but lost its majority in the Senate.

Breakaways
In January 2010, a breakaway faction led by Jerzy Polaczek split from the party to form Poland Plus. Its seven members of the Sejm came from the centrist, economically liberal wing of the party. On 24 September 2010, the group was disbanded, with most of its Sejm members, including Polaczek, returning to Law and Justice.

On 16 November 2010, MPs Joanna Kluzik-Rostkowska, Elżbieta Jakubiak and Paweł Poncyljusz, and MEPs Adam Bielan and Michał Kamiński formed a new political group, Poland Comes First (Polska jest Najważniejsza). Kamiński said that the Law and Justice party had been taken over by far-right extremists. The breakaway party formed following dissatisfaction with the direction and leadership of Kaczyński.

On 4 November 2011, MEPs Zbigniew Ziobro, Jacek Kurski, and Tadeusz Cymański were ejected from the party, after Ziobro urged the party to split further into two separate parties – centrist and nationalist – with the three representing the nationalist faction. Ziobro's supporters, most of whom on the right-wing of the party, formed a new group in Parliament called Solidary Poland, leading to their expulsion, too. United Poland was formed as a formally separate party in March 2012, but has not threatened Law and Justice in opinion polls.

Base of support

Like Civic Platform, but unlike the fringe parties to the right, Law and Justice originated from the anti-communist Solidarity trade union (which is a major cleavage in Polish politics), which was not a theocratic organisation. Solidarity's leadership wanted to back Law and Justice in 2005, but was held back by the union's last experience of party politics, in backing Solidarity Electoral Action.

Today, the party enjoys great support among working class constituencies and union members. Groups that vote for the party include miners, farmers, shopkeepers, unskilled workers, the unemployed, and pensioners. With its left-wing approach toward economics, the party attracts voters who feel that economic liberalisation and European integration have left them behind. The party's core support derives from older, religious people who value conservatism and patriotism. PiS voters are usually located in rural areas and small towns. The strongest region of support is the southeastern part of the country. Voters without a university degree tend to prefer the party more than college-educated voters do.

Regionally, it has more support in regions of Poland that were historically part of western Galicia-Lodomeria and Congress Poland. Since 2015, the borders of support are not as clear as before and party enjoys support in western parts of country, especially these deprived ones. Large cities in all regions are more likely to vote for more liberal party like PO or .N. Still PiS receives good support from poor and working class areas in large cities.

Based on this voter profile, Law and Justice forms the core of the conservative post-Solidarity bloc, along with the League of Polish Families and Solidarity Electoral Action, as opposed to liberal conservative post-Solidarity bloc of Civic Platform. The most prominent feature of PiS voters was their emphasis on decommunisation.

Ideology

Initially, the party was broadly pro-market, although less so than the Civic Platform. It has adopted the social market economy rhetoric similar to that of western European Christian democratic parties. In the 2005 election, the party shifted to the protectionist left on economics. As Prime Minister, Kazimierz Marcinkiewicz was more economically liberal than the Kaczyńskis, advocating a position closer to Civic Platform.

On foreign policy, PiS is Atlanticist and less supportive of European integration than Civic Platform. The party is soft eurosceptic and opposes a federal Europe especially the Euro currency. In its campaigns, it emphasises that the European Union should "benefit Poland and not the other way around". It is a member of the anti-federalist European Conservatives and Reformists Party, having previously been a part of the Alliance for Europe of the Nations and, before that, the European People's Party. Although it has some elements of Christian democracy, it is not a Christian democratic party. It is positioned on the right wing.

Platform

Economy
The party supports a state-guaranteed minimum social safety net and state intervention in the economy within market economy bounds. During the 2015 election campaign, it proposed tax rebates related to the number of children in a family, as well as a reduction of the VAT rate (while keeping a variation between individual types of VAT rates). In 2019, the lowest personal income tax threshold was decreased from 18% to 17%. Also: a continuation of privatisation with the exclusion of several dozen state companies deemed to be of strategic importance for the country. PiS opposes cutting social welfare spending, and also proposed the introduction of a system of state-guaranteed housing loans. PiS supports state provided universal health care. PiS has been also described as statist, protectionist, solidarist, and interventionist. They also hold agrarianist views.

National political structures

PiS has presented a project for constitutional reform including, among others: allowing the president the right to pass laws by decree (when prompted to do so by the Cabinet), a reduction of the number of members of the Sejm and Senat, and removal of constitutional bodies overseeing the media and monetary policy. PiS advocates increased criminal penalties. It postulates aggressive anti-corruption measures (including creation of an Anti-Corruption Bureau (CBA), open disclosure of the assets of politicians and important public servants), as well as broad and various measures to smooth the working of public institutions.

PiS is a strong supporter of lustration (lustracja), a verification system created ostensibly to combat the influence of the Communist era security apparatus in Polish society. While current lustration laws require the verification of those who serve in public offices, PiS wants to expand the process to include university professors, lawyers, journalists, managers of large companies, and others performing "public functions". Those found to have collaborated with the security service, according to the party, should be forbidden to practice in their professions.

Diplomacy and defence
The party is in favour of strengthening the Polish Army through diminishing bureaucracy and raising military expenditures, especially for modernisation of army equipment. PiS planned to introduce a fully professional army and end conscription by 2012 (in August 2008, compulsory military service was abolished in Poland). It is also in favour of participation of Poland in foreign military missions led by the United Nations, NATO and United States, in countries like Afghanistan and Iraq.

PiS is eurosceptic, although the party supports integration with the European Union on terms beneficial for Poland. It supports economic integration and tightening cooperation in areas of energy security and military operations, but is sceptical about closer political integration. It is against the formation of a European superstate or federation. PiS is in favour of a strong political and military alliance between Poland and the United States.

In the European Parliament it is a member of the European Conservatives and Reformists, a group founded in 2009 to challenge the prevailing pro-federalist ethos of the European Parliament and address the perceived democratic deficit existing at a European level.

They have frequently expressed anti-German, and anti-Russian stances. They have also expressed anti-Ukrainian sentiment in the past.

Law and Justice have generally taken a hardline stance against Russia in its foreign policy.

Social policies
The party's views on social issues are much more traditionalist than those of social conservative parties in other European countries, and its social views reflect the those of the Christian right. PiS has been described to hold right-wing populist views.

Family
The party strongly promotes itself as a pro-family party and encourages married couples to have more children. Prior to 2005 elections, it promised to build three million inexpensive housing units as a way to help young couples start a family. Once in government, it passed legislation lengthening parental leaves.

In 2017, the PiS government commenced the so-called "500+" programme under which all parents residing in Poland receive an unconditional monthly payment of 500 PLN for each second and subsequent child (the 500 PLN support for the first child being linked to income). It also revived the idea of a housing programme based on state-supported construction of inexpensive housing units.

Also in 2017, the party's MPs passed a law that bans most retail trade on Sundays on the premise that workers will supposedly spend more time with their families.

Abortion 

The party is anti-abortion and supports further restrictions on Poland's abortion laws which are already one of the most restrictive in Europe. PiS opposes abortion resulting from foetal defects which is currently allowed until specific foetal age.

In 2016 PiS supported legislation to ban abortion under all circumstances, and investigate miscarriages. After the black Protests the legislation was withdrawn.

In October 2020 the Constitutional Court ruled that one of three circumstances (foetal defects) is unconstitutional. However, many constitutionalists argue that this judgement is invalid.

The party is against euthanasia and comprehensive sex education. It has proposed a ban of in-vitro fertilisation.

Disability rights
In April 2018, the PiS government announced a PLN 23 billion (EUR 5.5 billion) programme (named "Accessibility+") aimed at reducing barriers for disabled people, to be implemented 2018–2025.

Also in April 2018, parents of disabled adults who required long-term care protested in Sejm over what they considered inadequate state support, in particular, the reduction of support once the child turns 18. As a result, the monthly disability benefit for adults was raised by approx. 15 per cent to PLN 1,000 (approx. EUR 240) and certain non-cash benefits were instituted, although protesters' demands of an additional monthly cash benefit were rejected.

Gay rights

The party opposes LGBT rights, in particular same-sex marriages and any other form of legal recognition of same-sex couples. In 2020, Poland was ranked the lowest of any European Union country for LGBT rights by ILGA-Europe. The organisation also highlighted instances of anti-LGBT rhetoric and hate speech by politicians of the ruling party.  A 2019 survey by Eurobarometer found that more than two-thirds of LGBT people in Poland believe that prejudice against them has risen in the last five years.

On 21 September 2005, PiS leader Jarosław Kaczyński said that "homosexuals should not be isolated, however they should not be school teachers for example. Active homosexuals surely not, in any case", but that homosexuals "should not be discriminated otherwise". He has also stated, "The affirmation of homosexuality will lead to the downfall of civilization. We can't agree to it". Lech Kaczyński, while mayor of Warsaw, refused authorisation for a gay pride march; declaring that it would be obscene and offensive to other people's religious beliefs. He stated, "I am not willing to meet perverts." In Bączkowski and Others v. Poland, the European Court of Human Rights unanimously ruled that the ban of the parade violated Articles 11, 13 and 14 of the European Convention on Human Rights. The judgement stated that "The positive obligation of a State to secure genuine and effective respect for freedom of association and assembly was of particular importance to those with unpopular views or belonging to minorities".

In 2016 Beata Szydło's government disbanded the Council for the Prevention of Racial Discrimination, Xenophobia and Intolerance, an advisory body set up in 2011 by then-Prime Minister Donald Tusk. The council monitored, advised and coordinated government action against racism, discrimination and hate crime.

Many local towns, cities, and Voivodeship sejmiks comprising a third of Poland's territory have declared their respective regions as LGBT-free zones with the encouragement of the ruling PiS. Polish President Andrzej Duda, who was the Law and Justice party's candidate for presidency in 2015 and 2020, stated that "LGBT is not people, it's an ideology which is worse than Communism." During his 2020 successful election campaign, he pledged he would ban teaching about LGBT issues in schools and he proposed changing the constitution to ban LGBT couples from adopting children.

Nationalism

Academic research has characterised Law and Justice as a partially nationalist party, but PiS's leadership rejects this label. Both Kaczyńskis look up for inspirations to the pre-war Sanacja movement with its leader Józef Piłsudski, in contrast to the nationalist Endecja that was led by Piłsudski's political archrival, Roman Dmowski. However, parts of the party, especially the faction around Radio Maryja, are inspired by Dmowski's movement. Polish far-right organisations and parties such as National Revival of Poland, National Movement and Autonomous Nationalists regularly criticise PiS's relative ideological moderation and its politicians for "monopolizing" official political scene by playing on the popular patriotic and religious feelings. However, the party does include several overtly nationalist politicians in senior positions, such as Digital Affairs Minister Adam Andruszkiewicz, the former leader of the All-Polish Youth; and deputy PiS leader and former Defence Minister Antoni Macierewicz, the founder of the National-Catholic Movement. It has been also described as national-conservative.

Refugees and economic migrants 
PiS opposed the quota system for mass relocation of immigrants proposed by the European Commission to address the 2015 European migrant crisis. This contrasted with the stance of their main political opponents, the Civic Platform, which have signed up to the Commission's proposal. Consequently, in the campaign leading to the 2015 Polish parliamentary election, PiS adopted the discourse typical of the populist-right, linking national security with immigration. Following the election, PiS sometimes utilised Islamophobic rhetoric to rally its supporters.

Examples of anti-migration and anti-Islam comments by PiS politicians when discussing the European migrant crisis: in 2015, Jarosław Kaczyński stated that Poland can not accept any refugees because "they could spread infectious diseases." In 2017, the first Deputy Minister of Justice Patryk Jaki stated that "stopping Islamization is his Westerplatte". In 2017, Interior minister of Poland Mariusz Błaszczak stated that he would like to be called "Charles the Hammer who stopped the Muslim invasion of Europe in the 8th century". In 2017, Deputy Speaker of the Sejm Joachim Brudziński stated during the pro-party rally in Siedlce; "if not for us (PiS), they (Muslims) would have built mosques in here (Poland)."

Structure

Internal factions
Law and Justice is divided into many internal factions, but they can be grouped into three main blocs.

The most influential group within PiS is unofficially named "Order of the Centre Agreement". It is led by leader is Jarosław Kaczyński, and its main members are Joachim Brudziński, Adam Lipiński and Mariusz Błaszczak.

The second major group is a radical, religious and hard Eurosceptic right-wing faction focused around Antoni Macierewicz, Beata Szydło and the United Poland party of Zbigniew Ziobro. This faction opts for radical reforms and is supported by Jacek Kurski and Tadeusz Rydzyk.

The third major group is a Christian-democratic, republican and conservative-liberal faction focused around Mateusz Morawiecki, Łukasz Szumowski, Jacek Czaputowicz and the Agreement party of Jarosław Gowin. Although not officially a party member, Polish president Andrzej Duda can also be placed in this faction.

Political committee 
President:
 Jaroslaw Kaczynski

Vice-Presidents:
 Mariusz Błaszczak
 Joachim Brudziński
 Mariusz Kamiński
 Antoni Macierewicz
 Beata Szydło

Treasurer:
 Teresa Schubert

 'Spokesperson:
 Anita CzerwińskaParty discipline spokesman:
 Karol KarskiChairman of the Executive Committee:
 Krzysztof SobolewskiPresident of the Parliamentary Club':
 Ryszard Terlecki

Leadership

Election results

Sejm

Senate

European Parliament

*Currently 16: Zdzisław Krasnodębski is elected from the PiS register, but not a member of the party, Mirosław Piotrowski left PiS (08.10.2014), Marek Jurek is a member of Right Wing of the Republic.

Presidential

Regional assemblies

County councils

Mayors

Presidents of the Republic of Poland

Prime Ministers of the Republic of Poland

Voivodeship Marshals

See also

 2010 Polish Air Force Tu-154 crash
 Democratic Party of Korea - The party is a liberal party, ideologically different from the Law and Justice, but there is a controversy that the two parties use anti-Japanese (DPK) and anti-German (PiS) sentiment politically.
 Liberal Democratic Party (Japan)
 List of Law and Justice politicians
 People Power Party (South Korea)
 Polish constitutional crisis, 2015
 Polish nationalism
 Slovenian Democratic Party

Explanatory notes

Citations

General references

External links

 

 
Anti-German sentiment in Europe
Anti-Russian sentiment
Christian political parties in Poland
Conservative parties in Poland
Euroscepticism in Poland
National conservative parties
Political parties in Poland
Right-wing parties in Europe
Right-wing populist parties
Social conservative parties